Redlands East Valley High School is a public English medium co-educational high school in Redlands, California, United States, near the San Bernardino Mountains. The school opened in the 1997-1998 school year as part of the Redlands Unified School District.

Description

Redlands East Valley is a  comprehensive high school located on a  sloping site, designed to house 2,500 students. An element in the design was a focus on the media center and its application of technology. The majority of the building exteriors are built with concrete masonry, exposed structural steel, glass, and metal roofs. The school colors and mascot were chosen to contrast cross-town rival Redlands High School, an example being how Redlands East Valley has a Wildcat and Redlands High has a Terrier.

The school cost US$35,000,000 (41 million 1995) to build and was completed in September 1997. The roof of the Media Center Library was designed to look like an opened book. The performing arts building was designed to look like a piano, complete with black and white tiles on the floor in the piano lab. The Performing Arts Theater is named in honor of Harry Blackstone Jr., a stage magician who lived in Redlands. The school offers the Advanced Placement program.

Sports

Football
The Redlands East Valley Wildcats play in the Citrus Belt League. Under then head coach Kurt Bruich, the football team has at one point been positioned #2 in the state and #17 in the nation, and has gone to state championship as well. With REV's victory over the Citrus Hill Hawks on November 28, 2014, the school became the first in the district since 1979 to reach the CIF finals. On December 5, 2014, Redlands East Valley football won their first CIF championship and two weeks after, the school won their first state championship, defeating Clayton Valley Charter High School in the Division II championship.

Wrestling 
The REV wrestling team was the first boys team in school history to win a CIF title as well as the first team to ever win an individual state title. In 2010 the boys wrestling team became REV's first boys CIF champions. In 2011 Redlands East Valley Wrestler Chris Mecate became the school's first ever individual CIF state champion.

Notable alumni
Matt Andriese, baseball player
Landon Donovan, soccer player 
Tyler Chatwood, baseball player
Ronnie Fouch, American college football player
Tommy Hanson, baseball player 
Jaelan Phillips, American football player
Chris Polk, American football player
Kylie Fitts, American football player
Lil Xan, American rapper

References

External links
Redlands East Valley High School School website

Educational institutions established in 1997
High schools in San Bernardino County, California
Redlands Unified School District
Public high schools in California
1997 establishments in California
Buildings and structures in Redlands, California